Classic hits is a radio format.

Classic hits may also refer to:

Radio stations and networks
Classic Hits (Ireland), a Dublin-based multi-region radio station
The Hits (radio station), a New Zealand radio station, formerly called Classic Hits
Classic Hits (Westwood One), an American radio network
Classic Hits/Pop, a music format produced by Westwood One
Classic Hits 954/1530, now Sunshine 1530, an English radio station
Pure Gold Network, formerly Classic Hits Network, an Australian radio network

Television channels
Classic Hits (television channel), a television channel formed by That's Media to replace That's Music on Freeview

Albums
Classic Hits (John Paul Young album), 1988
Classic Hits Live, by Kottonmouth Kings, 2003
Classic Hits Live/Best of Live, by Foreigner, 1993

See also
Classic Hits of Harry Chapin, a 2003 album